Sand knifefish are freshwater electric fish of the family Rhamphichthyidae, from freshwater habitats in South America.

Just like most part of the members of the Gymnotiformes group, they also have elongated and compressed bodies and electric organs. The long anal fin actually extends from before the pectoral fins to the tip of the tail. There is no dorsal fin. Teeth are absent in the oral jaws and the snout is very long and tubular. The nostrils are very close together. This group is sometimes known as the tubesnout knifefishes for this reason.

They are nocturnal and burrow in the sand during the day.

Genera
According to FishBase there are only three genera in this family, but a comprehensive molecular study from 2015 showed that two additional genera belong here (formerly in Hypopomidae, marked with stars* in list), and this has been followed by recent authorities.

Gymnorhamphichthys
Hypopygus*
Iracema
Rhamphichthys
Steatogenys*

See also
 List of fish families

References

External links

 
Fish of South America
Ray-finned fish families
Weakly electric fish